Lezgian, Lezgin, Lezgi  or Lek can refer to:

 Lezgins, a people from southern Dagestan and northern Azerbaijan
 Lezgian language, the language spoken by Lezgins

Language and nationality disambiguation pages